Keitt may refer to:
 Laurence M. Keitt, South Carolina politician
 Keitt (mango), mango cultivar